Bertram was Archdeacon of Armagh from 1256: he was still in office in 1261.

Notes

13th-century Irish Roman Catholic priests
Archdeacons of Armagh